The following is a list of teams and cyclists that took part in the 2019 Giro d'Italia.

Teams
All 18 UCI WorldTeams were automatically invited and were obliged to attend the race. Four wildcard UCI Professional Continental teams were also selected. Because of an agreement between RCS Sport and the organisers of the Coppa Italia di ciclismo (the Italian Road Cycling Cup) one of the four wildcards is traditionally reserved for the overall cup winner. All of the wildcard teams had previously participated in the Giro, and three out of the four teams participated in the previous year. The one exception was Nippo-Vini Fantini, whose last participation in the Giro was in 2016. Each team started with eight riders. The on-stage presentation of the teams took place in Bologna on 9 May, two days before the opening stage.

The teams entering the race were:

Cyclists

By starting number

By team

By nationality 
The 176 riders that are competing in the 2019 Giro d'Italia originated from 33 different countries.

References

External links
 

2019 Giro d'Italia
2019